is a Japanese professional boxer who held the WBC flyweight title from 2017 to 2018.

Amateur career

Higa turned pro at the age of 18, after a brief amateur career where he accrued a 36–8 record.

Professional career

Higa's manager is Boxing Hall of Fame member Yoko Gushiken. Higa made his professional debut in June 2014, defeating Saengkeng Saknarong by technical knockout less than a minute into the first round. He won his first title by stopping previously undefeated Thai fighter Kongfah CP Freshmart in 7 rounds to claim the WBC Youth flyweight title. He went on to defend that title twice before claiming the OPBF flyweight belt against Filipino gatekeeper Ardin Diale. Higa broke down and battered Diale with body shots, eventually stopping him in round 4.

Higa vs. Hernandez 
On 2017, Higa won a world championship in his first try, defeating Juan Hernández by technical knockout to become the WBC flyweight title. Hernández had won the title earlier that year against Nawaphon Por Chokchai and was scheduled to make his first defense against Higa. However, he lost his belt at the scales due to coming in over the weight limit. Higa dominated Hernández, dropping him five times over the course over the fight before the referee finally stopped the contest. With the win, Higa became Okinawa's first boxing world champion since Akinobu Hiranaka. 

After becoming a world champion, Higa said his goals were facing WBA champion Kazuto Ioka in a flyweight unification bout and breaking Japan's record of 15 consecutive knockouts.

Higa vs. Rosales 
On 15 April, 2018, Higa defended his WBC flyweight title for the third time in a row against challenger Cristofer Rosales. Higa lost the fight and his belt via TKO in the ninth round.

Higa vs. Tsutsumi 
On 26 October, 2020, Higa fought Seiya Tsutsumi. The fight ended in a majority draw, one judge scoring it in favour of Higa, 96-94, while the other two judges saw the fight as a draw, scoring it 95-95.

Higa vs. Kobayashi 
On 31 December, 2020, Higa fought Yuki Kobayashi, who was ranked #9 by the IBF and #14 by the WBO at bantamweight. Higa won via a fifth-round knockout.

Professional boxing record

Exhibition boxing record

See also
List of flyweight boxing champions
List of Japanese boxing world champions

References

External links

Daigo Higa - Profile, News Archive & Current Rankings at Box.Live

1995 births
Living people
Flyweight boxers
Super-flyweight boxers
World flyweight boxing champions
World Boxing Council champions
Sportspeople from Okinawa Prefecture
Japanese male boxers
Ryukyuan people
People from Okinawa Prefecture